Wildlife is the third album by the British band Mott the Hoople.

The album was originally released in 1971; in the UK by Island Records (catalogue number ILPS 9144) and in the US by Atlantic Records (cat. no. SD 8284). It was subsequently re-released by Angel Air in 2003 SJPCD159.

It reached No. 44 in the UK Albums Chart in April 1971.

Recording
The album was recorded in November and December 1970 at Island Studios in London. It was produced by Guy Stevens and Mott the Hoople. The engineers were Andy Johns, Brian Humphries, and Phill Brown.

Release
The album was released on vinyl in 1971; in the UK by Island Records and in the US by Atlantic Records. It was subsequently re-released on CD by Angel Air in 2003. It was the band's third album since their debut, Mott the Hoople, in 1969.

Reception

Ben Edmonds, reviewing for Rolling Stone in June 1971, felt that the band and singer Ian Hunter had moved on from the Bob Dylan comparisons of the first two albums, and had added a country music influence, to produce an album with "more than enough solid music" to warrant some attention in America.

The album reached No. 44 in the UK Albums Chart in April 1971.

Legacy
Stephen Thomas Erlewine of AllMusic gave the album four stars out of five and stated:

Track listing
Side one
 "Whisky Women" (Mick Ralphs) – 3:34
 "Angel of Eighth Avenue" (Ian Hunter) – 4:25
 "Wrong Side of the River" (Ralphs) – 5:14
 "Waterlow" (Hunter) – 3:00
 "Lay Down" (Melanie Safka) – 4:02

Side two
 "It Must Be Love" (Ralphs) – 2:15
 "Original Mixed-Up Kid" (Hunter) – 3:35
 "Home Is Where I Want to Be" (Ralphs) – 4:07
 "Keep a Knockin'" (live at Fairfield Halls, Croydon, 13 September 1970) (Richard Penniman) – 9:50*

 *This track is a rock and roll medley that, in addition to "Keep a Knockin'", includes snippets of "I Got a Woman" (by Ray Charles), "What'd I Say" (Charles) and "Whole Lotta Shakin' Goin' On" (Jerry Lee Lewis).  On the recording, singer Ian Hunter incorrectly introduces "What'd I Say" as being written by Jerry Lee Lewis.

2003 CD bonus tracks
 "It'll Be Me" (Jack Clement) – 2.58
 "Long Red" (Leslie West, Felix Pappalardi, John Ventura, Norman Landsberg) – 3.47

2018 CD bonus track

In 2018, as part of a boxed set of Island era material, "Whiskey Women" was issued under its original title of "Brain Haulage". This is an unedited take, with the guitar power-chords mixed higher. It's heavier, and closer to the live versions of the song.

Personnel
Mott the Hoople
 Ian Hunter – lead vocals (tracks 2, 4, 5, 7, 9), and backing vocals, rhythm guitar, piano
 Mick Ralphs – lead guitar, lead vocals (tracks 1, 3, 6, 8), backing vocals
 Verden Allen – organ, backing vocals
 Pete "Overend" Watts – bass, backing vocals
 Dale "Buffin" Griffin – drums, backing vocals

Additional personnel
 Jerry Hogan – steel guitar on "It Must Be Love" and "Original Mixed-Up Kid"
 Jess Roden – background chorus on "Lay Down"
 Stan Tippins – background chorus on "Lay Down"
 Michael Gray – string arrangements and conductor on "Waterlow"
 Jim Archer – violin on "Angel of Eighth Avenue"

Technical
 Andy Johns, Brian Humphries, Phill Brown – engineers
 Brian Cooke – photography

Charts

References

1971 albums
Mott the Hoople albums
Albums produced by Guy Stevens
Island Records albums